James Leslie Gattuso ( December 1, 1957 – July 23, 2020) was a senior research fellow for the Roe Institute for Economic Policy Studies at the Heritage Foundation, a conservative think tank based in Washington D.C. He specialized in regulatory issues and telecommunications policy. Gattuso contributed articles to many publications including The Wall Street Journal, USA Today and The Washington Times.

Education
Gattuso graduated from the University of Southern California in 1979, and he received his J.D. from the UCLA School of Law in 1983.

Career
Gattuso was a policy analyst at the Heritage Foundation from 1985 to 1990, where he focused on telecommunications, transportation, and antitrust policy.

From 1990 to 1993, Gattuso served as deputy chief of the Office of Plans and Policy at the Federal Communications Commission. During part of his tenure, he was appointed associate director of the President's Council on Competitiveness, working for Vice President Dan Quayle. In 1993, Citizens for a Sound Economy named Gattuso vice president of policy development, a position he held until 1997. He then served as vice president of policy at the Competitive Enterprise Institute.

Gattuso rejoined Heritage in 2002 as a senior research fellow. In 2009, he received the Glenn and Rita Ricardo Campbell Award, presented each year by the Heritage Foundation for "outstanding contribution to the analysis and promotion of the Free Society". He is also a regular contributor to the Heritage Foundation’s blog and previously to Bloomberg's online service, Bloomberg Government.

In general, Gattuso favored limiting regulations at the federal level. Specifically, Gattuso tended to favor decreased government involvement when it came to regulatory, transportation and telecommunication policy, arguing instead for private enterprise solutions. He also opposes net neutrality, calling it a "regulatory overreach".

In 2011, Gattuso was influential in stopping the SOPA/PIPA online copyright legislation, authoring a report for The Heritage Foundation criticizing those proposals.

Along with his colleague Diane Katz, he also authored an annual review on trends in federal regulation, called "Red Tape Rising",  which became a widely cited barometer of regulatory activity.

In 2011, Gattuso indirectly appeared on the Tonight Show when Jay Leno showed a video of Gattuso on an earlier Fox News segment, and asked the question "Would his hair look better as a beard?" digitally moving his hair around to his chin, leaving him bearded and bald.

Gattuso died in July 2020.

References

External links 
  Heritage Foundation bio page
 

1957 births
2020 deaths
The Heritage Foundation
People from Lynwood, California
Mackinac Center for Public Policy